Santo Domingo, officially the Municipality of Santo Domingo, is a 3rd class municipality in the province of Nueva Ecija, Philippines. According to the 2020 census, it has a population of 61,092 people.

As an agricultural town, Santo Domingo is famous for its scenic agricultural landscape amid its Philippine duck raising industry. In Barangay Baloc along the Maharlika Highway is the Mariano Noriel landmark park and plaza. It is bordered by the municipalities of Talavera to the east, Quezon to the west, Science City of Muñoz to the north, Guimba to the northwest, and Aliaga to the south.

Etymology
The town got its name from Saint Dominic, which became the town's patron saint.

History
During the last quarter of the 17th century, Ilocos and Bulacan natives migrated to Santo Domingo. They found in the settlement buri palms. Therefore, these people called the site, Pulong Buli. Santo Domingo de Guzman became their Patron saint. The settlement became a Municipio but was later demoted to a mere barangay of Talavera, Nueva Ecija in 1903. It was later reverted to the political status of Municipality. The Alejos, Juans, Samatras, Salamancas, Andreses, Pascuals and Tomases were the descendants of the founders of the town.

During the Japanese Occupation from 1942 to 1945, various local guerrillas and Hukbalahap communist groups fought side by side at Santo Domingo, aided by the Filipino soldiers of the Philippine Commonwealth Army units. Following the Allied liberation in 1945, over 4,500 Filipino soldiers and guerrillas had been killed or wounded, and 29,000 Japanese troops killed or captured in action.

Geography

Barangays
Santo Domingo is politically subdivided into 24 barangays.

 Baloc
 Buasao
 Burgos
 Cabugao
 Casulucan
 Comitang
 Concepcion
 Dolores
 General Luna
 Hulo
 Mabini
 Malasin
 Malayantoc
 Mambarao
 Poblacion
 Malaya (Pook Malaya)
 Pulong Buli
 Sagaba
 San Agustin
 San Fabian
 San Francisco
 San Pascual
 Santa Rita
 Santo Rosario

Climate

Demographics

Religion

St. Dominic Parish Church

The 1896 St. Dominic Parish Church (Real St., Poblacion, Santo Domingo, 3133 Nueva Ecija) belongs to the Roman Catholic Diocese of San Jose. Most. Rev. Roberto Calara Mallari, D.D. (since 15 May 2012) is the head of the Diocese. The Church's Parish Priest is Very Rev. Mnsgr. Rolando Mabutol, Hp and its Parish Administrator is Rev. Fr. Ian Christopher D. Andal (Acting Parish Priest) (Vicariate of St. Dominic - Diocesis Sancti Josephi in Insulis Philippinis, Suffragan of Lingayen-Dagupan; created: February 16, 1984, erected July 14, 1984, comprising the City of San Jose and the Science City of Muñoz and 12 other municipalities in Northern Nueva Ecija; Titular: St. Joseph the Worker, May 1). Its Vicar Forane is Fr. Bonifacio P. Flores Saint Dominic Parish Titular: Saint Dominic de Guzman; Year of Establishment: 1929.

Founded in 1896 as part of the Manila Archdiocese, in 1929, the Church was established and in 1950, the Parish became part of the Diocese of Cabanatuan. In 1977 the Baloc Parish was severed from Santo Domingo. On July 14, 1984, the Diocese of Cabanatuan was split into 2, and the San Jose Diocese had 16 Parishes including Santo Domingo Parish.
The first Parish Priest of Santo Domingo was Fr. Emilio Gutierez and the 19th, the incumbent is Fr. Edwin I. Bravo. The Parish has a population of 21,677 Catholics: 75%.

St. Jerome Parish Church

The St. Jerome Parish Church (Barangay Baloc, Santo Domingo, 3133 Nueva Ecija) belongs to the Roman Catholic Diocese of San Jose. Most. Rev. Roberto Calara Mallari, D.D. (since 15 May 2012) is the head of the Diocese (Vicariate of St. Dominic - Diocesis Sancti Josephi in Insulis Philippinis, Suffragan of Lingayen-Dagupan; created: February 16, 1984, erected July 14, 1984, comprising the City of San Jose and the Science City of Muñoz and 12 other municipalities in Northern Nueva Ecija; Titular: St. Joseph the Worker, May 1). Its Vicar Forane is Fr. Bonifacio P. Flores and its Parish Priest: Fr. Rosalito F. Cabanting. The Population is 45,049 Catholics -8%.

Iglesia Filipina Independiente, San Geronimo Church

The Iglesia Filipina Independiente, San Geronimo Church is also one of the landmark religious heritage of Santo Domingo.

Dambana ni San Geronimo
Fr. Resty Valenzuela Ahyong Baloc established his own Dambana ni San Geronimo when he transferred from the Roman Catholic Church.
The people of Baloc, Santo Domingo Nueva Ecija became religious because of Him. He wrote a book about the life of St. Jerome.

Economy

Government
The head of the executive department is Mayor Imee L. De Guzman. Botika ng Bayan, Starter Kit Project and Infrastructure Projects are part of the mission and vision of the administration. Hybrid rice (SL 8H) is the latest agriculture breed that the natives promoted.

Hybrid Rice Top Yielder is MR. Gregorio Alcantara of Barangay Sagaba, Santo Domingo, with an average yield of 218 cavans per hectare at 14%mc and 50 kg. per cavan.

Businesswoman Angelita Reyes-Castellano of Barangay Malayantoc in Sto, Domingo, Nueva Ecija, manages the family-owned 20-hectare farm “A. Castellano Ricemill” which supplies at least 30,000 bags of milled rice every month to customers throughout Luzon.

The Legislative department is under Gregand Andres, Municipal Vice Mayor and the Councilors, Members of the Sangguniang Bayan, who conduct their legal business at the Session hall.

The Judicial department's seat is in the Municipal Trial Court. The incumbent is MTC Acting Presiding Judge Frazierwin V. Viterbo assisted by Clerk of Court II, Mary DeLa Fuente-Noveras.

Gallery

References

External links

Website of Santo Domingo
[ Philippine Standard Geographic Code]
Philippine Census Information
Local Governance Performance Management System

Municipalities of Nueva Ecija